AVCC may refer to: 
 Antiviral Chemistry & Chemotherapy, a scientific journal
 Australian Vice-Chancellors' Committee